Harold Norman Horder (23 February 1894 – 21 August 1978) was an Australian rugby league player. He was a national and state representative player whose club career was with South Sydney and North Sydney between 1912 and 1924. Regarded as one of the greatest wingers to play the game, from 1924 until 1973 his 152 career tries was the NSWRFL record.

Playing career
Born in Surry Hills, New South Wales, Horder played 86 games for Souths between 1912–1919 and 1924, 31 games for New South Wales, 13 Test matches for Australia.

After following his brother Clarence "Spot" Horder to South Sydney, Harold, in his first game, stepped and swerved through the entire Glebe team in a 90 metre dash to score one of the greatest individual tries in rugby league history. He went on to be the NSW Rugby Football League's top try scorer in  1913, 1914 and 1917 and for each of the four seasons 1913, 1914, 1918 and 1922 he was the League's top point scorer.

The Gregory's reference records that, in the 1912 City Cup-tie against Glebe, Harold induced the Souths selectors to name his relatively inexperienced brother Clarrie in the side. While Glebe was concentrating on Harold, Clarrie cut holes in the defence and Souths won 30-5.

Horder was selected to make his debut for Australia during the 1914 Great Britain Lions tour of Australia and New Zealand. He was selected to go on the 1921–22 Kangaroo tour of Great Britain.  He scored 102 tries for South Sydney and 50 tries for North Sydney.  Horder scored 20 individual points in Norths' 1922 grand final win which consisted of 2 tries and 7 goals. In his final season at Souths he became the first player to score 150 tries in NSWRFL history.  His final game in the NSWRFL competition was the 1924 grand final loss against Balmain which finished 3-0, the lowest scoring grand final Australian rugby league history.  In total, Horder won 4 premierships, 2 with Souths in 1914 and 1918.  Horder then won 2 premierships with Norths in 1921 and 1922.

In 1918 he overtook Dally Messenger's record for the most points scored in an NSWRFL career (379); Horder's eventual total of 758 stood as the new career record for nine seasons until it was bettered by Arthur Oxford in 1927.

In 1925, Harold moved to the Brisbane rugby league club Coorparoo as their captain coach for two seasons after leaving Souths.

He appeared in an Australian film In the Last Stride (1916).

Accolades
The New South Wales Rugby League's Rugby League Annual of 1928 commented "if he is not the greatest of all rugby league footballers, he is unquestionably the greatest of all wing three-quarters".

Horder was inducted into the Australian Rugby League Hall of Fame on 7 September 2004 at the Dally M Awards in Sydney.

In 2004 Horder was named by Souths in its South Sydney Dream Team, consisting of 17 players and a coach representing the club from 1908 through to 2004. In August, 2006 he was also named as a winger in the North Sydney Bears' Team of the Century.

In February 2008, Horder was named in the list of Australia's 100 Greatest
Players (1908–2007), that which was commissioned by the NRL and ARL to
celebrate the code's centenary year in Australia.

Footnotes

External links
Harold Horder at the Online Dictionary of Australian Biographies
Harold Horder at yesterdayshero.com.au

1894 births
1978 deaths
Australian rugby league players
Australasia rugby league team players
Australia national rugby league team players
New South Wales rugby league team players
North Sydney Bears players
Queensland rugby league team players
Rugby league players from Sydney
Rugby league wingers
South Sydney Rabbitohs players
South Sydney Rabbitohs captains